Jaymes Young (born Jaymes McFarland; September 1, 1991) is an American singer-songwriter and musician. On September 9, 2013, he debuted his first extended play, Dark Star. His debut album Feel Something was released on June 23, 2017.

Career

In 2013 he was signed to a recording contract with Atlantic Records and toured with the trip hop trio London Grammar. He released his second EP Habits of My Heart on September 28, 2014, on Atlantic Records and opened for Vance Joy on the latter's "Dream Your Life Away" tour. He was featured alongside Birdy in David Guetta's "I'll Keep Loving You" on Guetta's 2014 album Listen. In 2016, he worked with American electronic musician Zhu in co-writing and featuring un-credited vocals on two tracks, entitled "Hometown Girl" which was originally based on Meghan Gier and Benjamin Griffith's relationship and "Cold Blooded" which was based on Jaymes Young's life at a young age. The songs eventually became part of ZHU's debut studio album Generationwhy, which was released on July 29, 2016.

On June 23, 2017 he released his debut album Feel Something, featuring the RIAA certified gold single "I'll Be Good". On July 12, 2019 he released the standalone single "Happiest Year" which achieved viral success, and was also certified gold. In 2021, "Infinity" from his debut album hit #1 on TikTok's Viral chart and surged across streaming platforms. He is currently working on his next project.

Personal life
McFarland grew up in Seattle, Washington, and attributes his varied interest in music to his music-loving parents and two older brothers and one younger sister. His musical influences include Coldplay, Radiohead, Maroon 5, Iron & Wine, and Death Cab for Cutie. McFarland began playing the guitar and writing lyrics at age 14. Music became a creative outlet for his ideas and inspiration. Apart from music, his interests include science and philosophy. He currently resides in Los Angeles. Before he adopted the name Jaymes Young, McFarland was a member of a small Seattle-based band named Corner State that released a single album in 2010.

Discography

Studio albums

Extended plays

Mixtapes

Singles

As lead artist

As featured artist

Songwriting credits
 indicates a background vocal contribution.

 indicates an un-credited lead vocal contribution.

 indicates a credited vocal/featured artist contribution.

References

Living people
Musicians from Seattle
Songwriters from Washington (state)
Singers from Washington (state)
1991 births
21st-century American singers
21st-century American male singers
American male songwriters